Fort Holmes is a fortified earthen redoubt located on the highest point of Mackinac Island. Originally built in 1814 by British forces during the War of 1812, the redoubt was improved by that army throughout the course of the war (1812–1814) to help defend the adjacent Fort Mackinac from a possible attack by the U.S. Army.

The British named the redoubt Fort George and reinforced it with cannon, a blockhouse, and a magazine for gunpowder and other munitions. However, Fort Holmes never functioned as an independent military fortification. It was always a dependent outpost of nearby Fort Mackinac.

When United States armed forces reoccupied Mackinac Island in 1815 under the terms of the Treaty of Ghent, they took possession of Fort George. They surveyed and measured their prize, which they renamed Fort Holmes in honor of Major Andrew Holmes, a casualty in the 1814 Battle of Mackinac Island. However, the American army soon abandoned Fort Holmes.  The earthworks and buildings of the former redoubt slowly eroded and disappeared over the course of more than a century.

In 1936, as part of its mission to provide employment through public works projects during the nationwide Great Depression, the Works Progress Administration used the original 1817 American survey to rebuild Fort Holmes to its War of 1812 appearance. , however, most of the reconstructed buildings of Fort Holmes had again disappeared, except for the redoubt's earthen walls.

In 2015 the Mackinac Island State Park completed a second reconstruction of Fort Holmes that resumes the appearance that the redoubt had in 1817. The blockhouse includes interpretive panels inside, and is open in the summer. The redoubt and blockhouse can be rented for special occasions.

See also
 Brian Leigh Dunnigan, Fort Holmes [Reports in Mackinac History and Archeology: No. 10] (Mackinac State Historic Parks, Mackinaw City, Mich.) .

References

Works Progress Administration in Michigan
Michigan State Historic Sites
Mackinac Island State Park
Buildings and structures in Mackinac County, Michigan
Holmes
Holmes
Michigan in the War of 1812
1812 establishments in the United States
Historic district contributing properties in Michigan
Holmes
National Register of Historic Places in Mackinac County, Michigan